Milena Petkovic (Serbian Cyrillic: Милена Петковић; born 28 May 1993) is a Serbian professional handball player

International competitions 
 EHF Cup: 2011/12, 2015/16, 2016/17

 Challenge Cup: 2013/14, 2014/15.

References 
 Highlights 2015/16
 Highlights 2016/17
 https://www.juznevesti.com/Sport/Rukometasice-Naise-upisale-vaznu-pobedu.sr.html
 https://www.juznevesti.com/Sport/Veliki-bod-Naise-protiv-Izvora.sr.html

Notes

External links 
 EHF profil
 Official clube site
 News from clube at -{juznevesti.com}-
 Rezults on -{srbijasport.net}-
 Profil on site EHF-а
 SRB Milena Petkovic - Player Info
 Passport Milena Petkovic, Scoresway 
 

1993 births
Living people
Serbian female handball players